The Tale of Johnny Town-Mouse is a children's book written and illustrated by Beatrix Potter and first published by Frederick Warne & Co. In December 1918.  The tale is based on the Aesop fable, "The Town Mouse and the Country Mouse", with details taken from Horace's Satires 2.6.79-117. It tells of a country mouse and a city mouse who visit each other in their respective homes. After sampling the other's way of life, both express a decided preference for their own. The book was critically well received. The Johnny Town-mouse character appeared in a 1971 ballet film, and the tale has been adapted to a BBC television animated series.

Plot summary

The country mouse, Timmy Willie, falls asleep in a hamper, and is carried with the vegetables to the city, where the mice, including Johnny Town-Mouse, make him welcome, but finding the cat frightening and the food strange, he returns by the hamper.  Sometime later, Johnny Town-Mouse pays him a visit, but finding such things as cows and lawnmowers frightening, returns to the city himself.

Adaptions
An animated adaptation of the story, shown alongside The Tale of Two Bad Mice, was featured on The World of Peter Rabbit and Friends in 1995 with Johnny Town-Mouse voiced by British actor Hugh Laurie.

References 
Footnotes

Works cited

 
 
 

Bibliography

External links 

 

1918 children's books
 British children's books
Johnny Town-Mouse, The Tale of
Town-Mouse
Picture books by Beatrix Potter
Works based on Aesop's Fables
Frederick Warne & Co books